Thomas Johnston (1708–1767) was an American engraver, japanner, and heraldic painter in Colonial Boston. Johnston engraved the first print of an historical event in the Colonial America and was also the first manufacturer of church organs in the colonies. The pipe organ he built in 1758–1759 for Boston's Old North Church was in use for over a hundred years until another organ replaced it in 1886.

Pipe organ manufacturing 

Johnston's workshop was in his home's backyard. While he advertised his businesses as being organ making, engraving, and furniture merchant, he also worked as a japanner, painted coats of arms, and published books. He was an engraver of skill and a heraldic painter whose works included views of Boston. His furniture skills included japanning, a technique of rendering "elaborate applied decorations" onto furniture.

Though at least one other person had created a singular organ in the colonies before him, Johnston is considered to have been the first Bostonian to build an organ and had the earliest church organ manufacturing business in Colonial America. Boston's Old North Church's first organ was one imported by William Claggett in 1736. In 1752, the church decided to buy a replacement organ from Johnston that they wanted to be as loud as the Boston Trinity Church organ. Johnston finishing constructing the organ in 1759. This Johnston pipe organ was in regular use until the 1820s. The present casing is the completely-restored case from the Johnston instrument. The organ's inner workings – the pipes, pedals, bellows and so on (though of Johnston's type) – are completely new and date to the complete renovation/restoration that was started in 1992. In 1754, Johnston built an organ for St. Peter's in Salem, Massachusetts. Johnston is also known to have built organs for Boston's Deblois Concert Hall and for St. John's Church (in Portsmouth, New Hampshire). Some of his organs originally installed in a first church or venue were then later re-used secondhand in other churches.

After Johnston's death, his estate included various items from his many businesses, among them an incomplete organ, numerous pictures, various paintings, artist supplies, and copper plates for engraving and printing. In his will, he gave his wife Bathsheba the engraved copper plates for printing music for the psalms stating “I Thomas Johnston Give to my Wife Bathsheba Johnston all my psalm Tune plates together with the Press besides what her proportionable part of my Estate may be.”

Engravings 

Patricia E. Kane, writing in Colonial Massachusetts Silversmiths and Jewelers, says that though "the identity of his master is not known" theorizes that Johnston may have been trained by the craftsman William Burgis. Kane's evidence for this is that the map of Boston published by Burgis in 1728 was engraved for Burgis by Johnston "just at the time that Johnston would have been finishing his apprenticeship". Johnston's earliest known engraving is that map of Boston, titled Plan of Boston in New England, with its dedication to Massachusetts Governor William Burnet, governor of the Massachusetts Colony from 1727–1729. Johnston's various engravings include prints of scenes, business cards for tradesmen, legal certificates, currency, and even noted music scores. One of his apprentices was John Greenwood, whose varied artistic career included an early period assisting Johnston with painting and engraving.

Johnston engraved the first known print of an historical event in the colonies, an overview of the Battle of Lake George. The battle scene —A prospective plan of the battle fought near Lake George on the 8th of September 1755 – was originally drawn by Samuel Blodgett, a sutler who had witnessed the Battle. Johnston engraved Blodgett's sketch onto a copper plate with Boston printer Richard Draper printing it, with the print then being sold by Blodgett in December 1755. Johnston's engraving of the battle is divided into different sections. On the left an above view of marching soldiers, on the right the view of the soldiers' camp and of the battle itself. The engraving also pictures the Hudson River, Fort William Henry and the New York town of Fort Edward. A pamphlet consisting of five pages describing the Battle plus a single page of advertisements accompanied this engraving. Johnston's print was reprinted in London by Thomas Jefferys, being published six weeks later in February 1756, along with an explanatory eight-page pamphlet. 

Many of Johnston's print engravings along with various images can be found in the Colonial Society of Massachusetts' publication Boston Prints and Printmakers 1670–1775, including his engraving of artist John Greenwood's Yale College view, Prospect of Yale College.

Personal life 
Johnston was born in 1708 in Boston, Massachusetts. He became a member of the Brattle Street Church on June 5, 1726. 

Johnston's first wife was Rachel Thwing, they married on June 22, 1730. His second wife was Rachel's first cousin Bathsheba Thwing and that marriage took place 17 years later in 1747. Many of the sons developed careers based on skills adjacent to their father's various crafts and livelihoods. Three of Johnston's sons by his first wife Rachel — Thomas Jr., William, and Benjamin —all became artists or craftspeople of varying kinds, their skills including japanning, portrait painting, organ-building, and engraving. Rachel, a daughter from Johnston's first marriage, married Daniel Rea Jr. in 1764. After Johnston's death, Rea purchased his father-in-law's business and ran it until the early 1800s. John and Samuel Johnston, two of Johnston's sons from his second marriage, worked as portrait painters.

Death 
Johnston died (from what was called a fit of apoplexy) on May 8, 1767. His grave is located in Boston's historic King's Chapel Burying Ground.

Notes

References

Bibliography 

 

 

1708 births
1767 deaths
Artists from Boston
American pipe organ builders
18th-century American artists
18th-century American male artists
American illustrators
Pipe organ building companies
Musical instrument manufacturing companies of the United States